Franco Zambonelli is a full professor in Computer Science at the University of Modena and Reggio Emilia, Italy, since 2010.

Education and career
He received the PhD in Electronics and Computer Science from the University of Bologna in 1997, and started his activity at the University of Modena and Reggio Emilia in 1997.

His research interests include ubiquitous computing and internet of things, self-organizing and self-adaptive systems, and distributed artificial intelligence. His nearly full list of publications can be found at DBLP.

He was named Fellow of the Institute of Electrical and Electronics Engineers (IEEE) in 2014 "for contributions to software engineering for self-adaptive and self-organizing systems". He is also Distinguished of the Association for Computing Machinery (ACM) Scientist and Member of the Academia Europaea.

In 2018, he received the IFAAMAS Influential Paper Award for the article "Developing Multiagent Systems: the Gaia Methodology".

References

External links

20th-century births
Living people
Italian computer scientists
University of Bologna alumni
Academic staff of the University of Modena and Reggio Emilia
Fellow Members of the IEEE
Members of Academia Europaea
Year of birth missing (living people)